Catoptria nana is a moth in the family Crambidae. It was described by Okano in 1959. It is found in Japan (Honshu, Hokkaido).

References

Crambini
Moths described in 1959
Moths of Japan